

First round

|}

Second round

|}

Third round
3 groups of 2 teams each. Winners qualify for the Final Tournament.

|}

Nigeria won 3–2 and qualified for the 1976 Summer Olympics football tournament.

Ghana won 2–1 and qualified for the 1976 Summer Olympics football tournament.

Zambia won 5–4 on penalties after 1–1 on aggregates and qualified for the 1976 Summer Olympics football tournament.

Boycott

The three African participants boycotted the day before the start of the Games to protest the participation of New Zealand, whose rugby team planned a summer tour of South Africa in spite of the Soweto uprising.

Due to logistical issues and the large number of other African nations boycotting the Games, these teams could not be replaced, meaning the final tournament was played three teams short.

References 

Football qualification for the 1976 Summer Olympics
Football at the Summer Olympics – Men's African Qualifiers